The Battle of Berryville was fought September 3 and September 4, 1864, in Clarke County, Virginia.  It took place toward the end of the American Civil War.

After taking control of Smithfield Summit on August 29, Union Maj. Gen. Philip H. Sheridan marched to Berryville with his 50,000 man Army of the Shenandoah. At the same time Confederate Lt. Gen. Jubal A. Early sent Maj. Gen. Joseph B. Kershaw's division east from Winchester to Berryville. At about 5:00 p.m., Kershaw attacked Colonel Joseph Thoburn's division of the Army of West Virginia,  while they were preparing to go into camp. Kershaw routed Thoburn's left flank before the rest of the corps came to the rescue. Darkness ended the fighting, with both sides bringing in heavy reinforcements. The next morning, Early, seeing the strength of the Union's entrenched line, retreated behind Opequon Creek.

Notes

References
 Library of Congress Maps of Battle of Berryville (No. 23 & 23a)
 National Park Service battle description
 CWSAC Report Update

Valley campaigns of 1864
Battles of the Eastern Theater of the American Civil War
Inconclusive battles of the American Civil War
Berryville
Battle of Berryville
Conflicts in 1864
1864 in Virginia
September 1864 events